The Clerget 9B was a nine-cylinder rotary aircraft engine of the World War I era designed by Pierre Clerget. Manufactured in both France and Great Britain (Gwynnes Limited), it was used on such aircraft as the Sopwith Camel. The Clerget 9Bf was an increased stroke version.

Variants
Clerget 9B
(1913) 130 hp (97 kW). 1,300 produced by Ruston Proctor & Co Ltd of Lincoln
Clerget 9Bf
(1915) 140 hp (104 kW). Extended stroke (172 mm (6.75 in)) version, increasing capacity to  17.5 L (1,066.5 cu in). 1,750 produced by Gwynnes Limited and 600 produced by Ruston Proctor.

Applications

Clerget 9B

Armstrong Whitworth F.K.10
Avro 504
Avro 531
Bristol M.1
Cierva C.6
Cierva C.8
Fairey Hamble Baby
FBA Type C
Nieuport 12
Nieuport 17bis
Sopwith Baby
Sopwith Camel
Sopwith Scooter
Sopwith Triplane
Sopwith 1½ Strutter

Clerget 9Bf
Sopwith Camel

Engines on display 
A preserved Clerget 9B engine is on public display at the Fleet Air Arm Museum, RNAS Yeovilton.
A Clerget 9Bf engine is on display at the Powerhouse Museum, Sydney.
 A Clerget 9B is on display at the Pima Air & Space Museum in Arizona.

Operational (Airworthy) Rotary Engines
The Shuttleworth Collection based at Old Warden Aerodrome, UK, operate an airworthy late production Sopwith Triplane (G-BOCK) fitted with an original 9B as well as an airworthy late production Sopwith Camel (G-BZSC) fitted with an original long-stroke 9Bf. These aircraft can be seen displaying at home air displays through the summer months.

Specifications (Clerget 9B)

See also

References

Notes

Bibliography

 Gunston, Bill. World Encyclopaedia of Aero Engines. Cambridge, England. Patrick Stephens Limited, 1989. 
 Lumsden, Alec. British Piston Engines and their Aircraft. Marlborough, Wiltshire: Airlife Publishing, 2003. .

Air-cooled aircraft piston engines
1910s aircraft piston engines
9B
Rotary aircraft piston engines